Michael Huth (born 2 September 1969) is a German figure skating coach and former competitor for East Germany.

Competitive career

During his competitive career, Huth represented East Germany. He was the 1988 East German national champion and competed at the 1988 Winter Olympics in Calgary, where he placed 23rd.

Coaching
Following his retirement from competitive skating, Huth studied sports science and turned to coaching. He coaches in Oberstdorf. His current and former students include
  Annette Dytrt
  Carolina Kostner (World, European and Italian champion, and 2014 Olympic bronze medalist)
  Anton Kovalevski
  Sondre Oddvoll Bøe
  Ivan Righini
  Nicole Schott
  Silvio Smalun
  Susanne Stadlmüller
  Tomáš Verner (European and Czech champion)
  Kristin Wieczorek
  Lukas Britschgi (European bronze medalist)
  Alexia Paganini
  Valter Virtanen
  Jenni Saarinen

Huth and his wife organize IceDome, an annual summer training camp in Oberstdorf. 140 skaters from 20 countries took part in 2011.

Personal life 
Huth has two children with his wife, Claudia.

References 

East German figure skaters
German male single skaters
Olympic figure skaters of East Germany
Figure skaters at the 1988 Winter Olympics
German figure skating coaches
1969 births
Living people
Sportspeople from Dresden
Technical University of Munich alumni
20th-century German people
21st-century German people